Methyl-MDA may refer to:

 2-Methyl-MDA
 5-Methyl-MDA
 6-Methyl-MDA

Substituted amphetamines
Benzodioxoles
Entactogens and empathogens